The Economy of Kenya is market-based with a few state enterprises. It is also an emerging market and an averagely industrialised nation ahead of its East African peers. Kenya is a middle income nation and plans to be a newly industrialized nation in 2030. Major industries include agriculture, forestry, fishing, mining, manufacturing, energy, tourism and financial services. As of 2020, Kenya had the third largest economy in Sub-Saharan Africa, coming behind Nigeria and South Africa.

The government of Kenya is generally investment-friendly and has enacted several regulatory reforms to simplify both foreign and local investment, including the creation of an export processing zone. An increasingly significant portion of Kenya's foreign financial inflows are remittances by non-resident Kenyans who work in the United States, the Middle East, Europe and Asia.

As of September 2018, economic prospects were positive, with above 6% gross domestic product (GDP) growth expected. This growth was attributed largely to expansions in the telecommunications, transport, and construction sectors, a recovery in agriculture, and also the rise of small businesses helping to pull the economy. These improvements are supported by a large pool of highly educated professional workers. There is a high level of IT literacy and innovation, especially among young Kenyans.

In 2020, Kenya ranked 56th in the World Bank ease of doing business rating, up from 61st in 2019 (of 190 countries). Compared to its neighbors, Kenya has a well-developed social and physical infrastructure.

Economic history
The Kenyan coastal strip was integrated into the world economy by ancient world trade routes that spanned Africa, Asia and Europe between 70 AD and 1500 AD. Foreign merchants brought their merchandise to Kenyan coast and left with African goods. In 1499 AD, Vasco da Gama returned from discovering the sea route to India through South Africa. This new route allowed European nations to dominate the trade economy of the East African coast, with the Portuguese entrenching themselves in the 16th and 17th centuries. In the 18th century the Portuguese were replaced in this East African economic corridor by Omani Arabs. Eventually, the British replaced the Omani Arabs. In 1895 they dominated the coastal strip, and by 1920 they had followed the interior trade routes all the way to the Buganda Kingdom. To make this ancient economic trade route more profitable, the British used Indian laborers to build a railway from Mombasa at the coast to Kampala, the capital of Buganda kingdom, following the old trade route. Major towns were founded along the railway line, backed by European settler farming communities. The Indian laborers who did not return to India after railway construction ended were the first to establish shops (dukawallahs) in these towns. During the colonial period, the European settler farming community and the Indian dukawallahs established the foundations of the modern formal Kenyan economy. Prominent examples of Asian-Kenyan business owners whose businesses started as dukawallahs include Manu Chandaria and Madatally Manji. While Europeans and Indians enjoyed strong economic growth between 1920 and 1963, Africans were deprived of their land, dehumanized, and forced to work for minimal pay under extremely poor working conditions through a well-established system of racial segregation.

Kenya regained its independence in 1963. Under President Jomo Kenyatta, the Kenyan government promoted africanization of the Kenyan economy, generating rapid economic growth through public investment, encouragement of smallholder agricultural production, and incentives for private, often foreign, industrial investments. An influential sessional paper authored by Tom Mboya and Mwai Kibaki in 1965 stressed the need for Kenya to avoid both the capitalistic economy of the West and the communism of the East. The paper argued that Kenya should instead concentrate on African socialism, while avoiding linking Kenya's economic fortunes to any country or group of countries. From 1963 to 1973 GDP grew at an annual average rate of 6.6%, and during the 1970s it grew at an average rate of 7.2%. Agricultural production grew by 4.7% annually during in the same period, stimulated by redistributing estates, distributing new crop strains, and opening new areas to cultivation. However, the rate of GDP growth declined to 4.2% per year in the 1980s, and 2.2% a year in the 1990s.

Kenya's policy of import substitution, which started in 1946 with European and Asian enterprises, did not achieve the desired result of transforming Kenya's industrial base, and in the late 1970s rising oil prices began to make Kenya's manufacturing sector noncompetitive. In response, the government began a massive intervention in the private sector. Lack of export incentives, tight import controls, and foreign exchange controls made the domestic environment for investment even less attractive. From 1991 to 1993, Kenya had its worst economic performance since independence. Growth in GDP stagnated, and agricultural production shrank at an annual rate of 3.9%. Inflation reached a record of 100% in August 1993, and the government's budget deficit was over 10% of GDP. As a result of these issues, bilateral and multilateral donors suspended their aid programs in Kenya in 1991.

In the 1980s and 1990s, Kenya signed structural adjustment loans with the World Bank and IMF, the loans were to be given on condition that Kenya adopts some government reforms, a liberal trade and interest rate regime and an industrial policy that was outward-oriented among other reforms . The Kenyan economy performed very poorly during this era of World Bank and IMF driven liberalization at the height of Daniel Arap Moi administration.

In 1993, the Government of Kenya began a major program of economic reform and liberalization. A new minister of finance and a new governor of the central bank undertook a series of economic measures with the assistance of the World Bank and the International Monetary Fund (IMF). As part of this program, the government eliminated price controls and import licensing, removed foreign exchange controls, privatized a number of publicly owned companies, reduced the number of civil servants, and introduced conservative fiscal and monetary policies. From 1994 to 1996, Kenya's real GDP growth rate averaged just over 4% a year.

In 1997, however, the economy entered a period of slowing or stagnant growth, due in part to adverse weather conditions and reduced economic activity before the general elections in December 1997. In July 1997, the Government of Kenya refused to meet earlier commitments to the IMF on governance reforms. As a result, the IMF suspended lending for three years, and the World Bank also put a $90 million structural adjustment credit on hold.

The Government of Kenya subsequently took positive steps on reform, including the establishment of the Kenya Anti-Corruption Authority in 1997, and measures to improve the transparency of government procurement and reduce the government payroll. In July 2000, the IMF signed a $150 million Poverty Reduction and Growth Facility, and the World Bank followed shortly after with a $157 million Economic and Public Sector Reform credit. However, both were suspended. Despite some setbacks, this process of reform established Kenya as East Africa's economic powerhouse as well as the region's business hub.

Economic growth improved between 2003 and 2008, under the Mwai Kibaki administration. When Kibaki took power in 2003, he immediately established the National Debt Management Department at the treasury, reformed the Kenya Revenue Authority (KRA) to increase government revenue, reformed financial laws on banking, wrote off the debts of strategic public enterprises and ensured that 30% of government tax revenue was invested in economic development projects. With these National Rainbow Coalition (NARC) government-driven reforms, the KRA collected more tax revenue in 2004 than was anticipated. The government then initiated investments in infrastructure. By 2005, the Kenyan public debt had reduced from highs of 80% of GDP in 2002 to 27% of GDP in 2005. The financial sector greatly improved, and Equity Bank Kenya became one of the largest banks in East Africa. Economic growth improved from 2% in 2003 to 7% in 2007. In 2008, the growth slumped to 1% due to post-election violence before returning to an average of 5% between 2009 and 2013. However, in 2009 due to the drought and the global financial crisis, high input costs and a fall in demand for some of the country's exports, caused the agriculture sector contracted by 2.7%.

Between 2013 and 2018 under the Jubilee Party government led by Uhuru Kenyatta, GDP growth averaged above 5%. Growth in small businesses is credited with some of the improvement. Real GDP growth (annualised) was 5.7% in Q1 of 2018, 6.0% in Q2 2018 and 6.2% in Q3 2018. Despite this robust growth, concerns remain on Kenya's debt sustainability, current account deficit, fiscal consolidation and revenue growth.

The table below shows the GDP of Kenya estimated by the International Monetary Fund, with exchange rates for Kenyan shillings.

Economic planning: Vision 2030

Vision 2030 is Kenya's current blueprint for the future of economic growth. Its goal is to create a prosperous, and globally competitive nation with a high quality of life by the year 2030. To do this, it aims to transform Kenyan industry while creating a clean and secure environment. The vision is separated into three pillars: economic, social, and political.

The Economic Pillar
The economic pillar seeks to consistently achieve economic growth averaging more than 10% for 23 years beginning in the year 2007. The economic areas targeted are tourism, agriculture, wholesale/retail trade, manufacturing, IT-enabled services, and financial services.

The Social Pillar
The social pillar has the objective of improving the quality of life for all Kenyans. It aims to do this by targeting human and social welfare programs, specifically education and training, health, environment, housing and urbanisation, children and social development, and youth and sports. In 2018 President Uhuru Kenyatta established the Big Four Agenda, focusing on universal healthcare, manufacturing, affordable housing and food security to drive this pillar.

The Political Pillar
The political pillar envisions a democratic system that is issue-based, transparent, people-centered, results-oriented, and accountable to the public. It targets five main areas: the rule of law under the Constitution of Kenya, electoral and political processes, democracy and public service delivery, transparency and accountability, and security, peace building, and conflict management.

The New Constitution Of Kenya 2010 was inaugurated on 27 August 2010 to drive this pillar.

Currency, exchange rate, and inflation
Kenya's currency is printed by mandate of the Central Bank of Kenya. The bank began printing banknotes in 1996. Several versions of Kenya's banknotes and coinage have been launched into circulation since then. The most recent redesign of Kenya's currency was in 2019.

The exchange rate of the Kenyan Shilling between 2003 and 2010 averaged about KSh74-78 per US Dollar.

The average inflation between 2005 and July 2015 was 8.5%. In July 2015 Kenya's inflation rate was estimated to be 6.62%.

Government finances

Revenue and spending 
In 2006, Kenya's government revenue totaled US$4.448B and its estimated expenditures totaled US$5.377B. The government budget balance as a percentage of the gross domestic product improved to −2.1% in 2006 from −5.5% in 2004.

In 2012, Kenya set a budget of US$14.59B with a government revenue of approximately US$12B.

The 2018 budget policy report set a budget of US$30B. The government revenue was approximately US$29.5B, and a deficit of US$5B was borrowed.

In the financial year that ended in June 2020, the Kenya Revenue Authority collected a tax revenue that amounted to approximately US$15B.

Government debt 
From 1982, Kenya key public debt indicators rose above the critical level measured as a percentage of GDP and as a percentage of government revenue.

In 2002, the last year of Daniel arap Moi's administration, Kenya' s public debt stood at almost 80% of GDP. In the last 10 years of the Moi regime, the government was spending 94% of all its revenue on salaries and debt servicing to IMF, World Bank and other western countries.

In 2003, Mwai Kibaki's administration instituted a public debt management department within the treasury department to bring Kenya's debt down to sustainable levels.

In 2006, Kenya had a current account deficit of US$1.5B. This figure was a significant increase over 2005, when the current account had a deficit of US$495 million. In 2006, the current account balance as a percentage of gross domestic product was −4.2.

In 2006 Kenya's external debt totaled US$6.7B. With a GDP of US$25.83B in 2006, the public debt level stood at 27% of GDP.

In 2011 debt management report the national treasury noted that the debt was rising, growing to 40% of GDP in 2009 and to 54% of GDP by 2012.

In 2019, Kenya's debt had risen to an absolute amount of US$50B against a GDP of US$98B. The public debt level is thus 51% of GDP as of 2019.

In 2021,Kenya's debt had risen to an absolute amount of US$65B against a GDP of US$101B.The public debt level is thus 65% of GDP as of year 2021.

Kenya's largest bilateral lender since 2011 has been China, and the largest multilateral lender since 1963 has been the World Bank.

Economic Stimulus Program

The Kenya Economic Stimulus Program (ESP) was introduced in the 2010–2011 budget plan. The initiative aimed to stimulate economic activity in Kenya through investment in long-term solutions to the challenges of food security, rural unemployment and underdevelopment. Its stated objective was to promote regional development for equity and social stability, improving infrastructure, enhancing the quality of education, availing affordable health-care for all Kenyans, investing in the conservation of the environment, building Kenya's Information and communications technology (ICT) capacity and expanding access to ICT for the general populace of Kenya. The Ministry of Finance aimed to use this program to achieve regional development for equity and social stability.

Integrated Financial Management Information System
Originally introduced in 2003, the Integrated Financial Management Information System (IFMIS) was re-engineered by the Ministry of Finance to curb fraud and other malpractices. In doing this, the Ministry aimed to put Kenya's financial and economic information in a format that was accessible from an online platform, to improve management of public expenditures by the Ministry of Finance.

IFMIS enables fully integrated planning for the budgeting process since it links planning policy objectives and budget allocation. It also seeks to support the e-Government shared services strategy by taking government financial services online and making status reports readily available. The system offers improvements in planning and budgeting, monitoring, evaluation and accountability and budget execution.

Funds for the Inclusion of Informal Sector
The Fund for the Inclusion of Informal Sector (FIIS) is a fund that allows micro and small entrepreneurs (MSE) to access credit facilities, expand their businesses and increase their savings. It also aims to help informal enterprises transition to formal sector enterprises, through access to formal providers of financial services. FIIS is a revolving fund through which the government enters into credit facility agreements with select banks for lending to micro-and small-enterprises through branches, authorised banking agents and other channels, particularly mobile banking. An estimated 8.3 million Kenyans work in the informal sector.

Investor compensation fund
The Investor Compensation Fund is intended to compensate investors who suffer losses resulting from failure of a licensed stockbroker or dealer to meet his/her contractual obligations, up to a maximum of Sh.50,000 per investor.

Foreign economic relations

Since independence, Kenya has received both substantial foreign investment and significant amounts of development aid. Total aid was $943 million in 2006, which was 4% of gross national income. These investments come from Russia, China, the developed Western countries and Japan. Kenya hosts a large number of foreign multinational companies, as well as international organizations such as United Nations Environment Programme (UNEP) and many other non-governmental organizations. China's involvement has been increasing, while that of Western countries such as the United Kingdom has fallen significantly. Investments from multilateral agencies, particularly the World Bank and the European Development Fund, have increased. The most active investors currently are the Chinese.

Kenya is active within regional trade blocs such as the Common Market for Eastern and Southern Africa (COMESA) and the East African Community (EAC), a partnership of Kenya, Uganda, Tanzania, Rwanda, Burundi and South Sudan. The aim of the EAC is to create a common market of its member states modelled on the European Union. Among the early steps toward integration is the customs union which has eliminated duties on goods and non-tariff trade barriers among the members.

Exports 
Kenya's chief exports are horticultural products and tea. In 2005, the combined value of these commodities was US$1,150 million, about 10 times the value of Kenya's third most valuable export, coffee. Kenya's other significant exports are petroleum products, sold to near neighbours, fish, cement, pyrethrum, and sisal. The leading imports are crude petroleum, chemicals, manufactured goods, machinery, and transportation equipment. Africa is Kenya's largest export market, followed by the European Union.

The major destinations for exports are Uganda, Tanzania, the United Kingdom, and the Netherlands. Major suppliers are China, India, United Arab Emirates, Saudi Arabia, and South Africa. Kenya's main exports to the United States are garments traded under the terms of the African Growth and Opportunity Act (AGOA). Despite AGOA, Kenya's apparel industry is struggling to hold its ground against Asian competition and runs a trade deficit with the United States. Many of Kenya's problems relating to the export of goods are believed by economists to be caused by the fact that Kenya's exports are inexpensive items that do not bring substantial amounts of money into the country.

Kenya is the dominant trade partner for Uganda (12.3% exports, 15.6% imports) and Rwanda (30.5% exports, 17.3% imports).

Balance of trade 
Kenya typically has a substantial trade deficit. The trade balance fluctuates widely because Kenya's main exports are primary commodities subject to the effects of both world prices and weather. In 2005 Kenya's income from exports was about US$3.2 billion. The payment for imports was about US$5.7B, yielding a trade deficit of about US$2.5B.

Foreign investment policies 
Kenyan policies on foreign investment generally have been favourable since independence, with occasional tightening of restrictions to promote the africanisation of enterprises. Foreign investors have been guaranteed ownership and the right to remit dividends, royalties, and capital. In the 1970s, the government disallowed foreign investment unless there was also some government participation in the ownership of an enterprise.

Despite these restrictions, between 60% and 70% of industry is still owned from abroad. A significant portion of this can be traced to fraudulent asset transfers by British colonialists during the transition to independence. This created widespread poverty and encouraged the conditions that would lead to dependency on foreign aid. However, Kenyan has had more economic success and more success raising its own quality of life than many of its neighbours in sub-Saharan Africa.

Industries

Agriculture

Kenya produced in 2018:

 5.2 million tons of sugarcane;
 4 million tons of maize;
 1.8 million tons of potato;
 1.4 million tons of banana;
 946 thousand tons of cassava;
 871 thousand tons of sweet potato;
 775 thousand tons of mango (including mangosteen and guava);
 765 thousand tons of beans;
 599 thousand tons of tomato;
 674 thousand tons of cabbage;
 492 thousand tons of tea (3rd largest producer in the world, losing only to China and India);
 349 thousand tons of pineapple;
 336 thousand tons of wheat;
 239 thousand tons of carrot;
 233 thousand tons of avocado;
 206 thousand tons of sorghum;
 188 thousand tons of watermelon;
 179 thousand tons of cowpea;
 169 thousand tons of spinach;

In addition to smaller productions of other agricultural products, like papaya (131 thousand tons), coconut (92 thousand tons) and coffee (41 thousand tons).

The agricultural sector continues to dominate Kenya's economy, although only 15% of Kenya's total land area has sufficient fertility and rainfall to be farmed, and only 7 or 8% can be classified as first-class land. In 2006, almost 75% of working Kenyans made their living on the land, compared with 80% in 1980. About one-half of total agricultural output is non-marketed subsistence production. Agriculture is the second largest contributor to Kenya's gross domestic product (GDP), after the service sector. In 2005 agriculture, including forestry and fishing, accounted for about 24% of GDP, as well as for 18% of wage employment and 50% of revenue from exports. The principal cash crops are tea, horticultural produce, and coffee; horticultural produce and tea are the main growth sectors and the most valuable of all of Kenya's exports. In 2005 horticulture accounted for 23% and tea for 22% of total export earnings. Coffee has declined in importance with depressed world prices, accounting for just 5% of export receipts in 2005. The production of major food staples such as corn is subject to sharp weather-related fluctuations. Production downturns periodically necessitate food aid—for example, in 2004 aid was needed for 1.8 million people⎯because of Kenya's intermittent droughts. However, the expansion of credit to the agricultural sector has enabled farmers to better deal with the large risk of agriculture based on rainfall and the dramatic fluctuations of the prices of agricultural products.

Tea, coffee, sisal, pyrethrum, corn, and wheat are grown in the fertile highlands, one of the most successful agricultural production regions in Africa. Livestock predominates in the semi-arid savanna to the north and east. Coconuts, pineapples, cashew nuts, cotton, sugarcane, sisal, and corn are grown in the lower-lying areas.

Forestry and fishing
Resource degradation has reduced output from forestry. In 2004 roundwood removals came to 22,162,000 cubic meters. Fisheries are of local importance around Lake Victoria and have potential on Lake Turkana. Kenya's total catch reported in 2004 was 128,000 metric tons. However, output from fishing has been declining because of ecological disruption. Pollution, overfishing, and the use of unauthorised fishing equipment have led to falling catches and have endangered local fish species.

Mining and minerals

Kenya has no significant mineral endowment. The mining and quarrying sector makes a negligible contribution to the economy, accounting for less than 1% of GDP. The majority of this is contributed by the soda ash operation at Lake Magadi in south-central Kenya. Thanks largely to rising soda ash output, Kenya's mineral production in 2005 reached more than 1 million tons. One of Kenya's largest foreign-investment projects in recent years is the planned expansion of Magadi Soda. Apart from soda ash, the chief minerals produced are limestone, gold, salt, large quantities of niobium, fluorspar, and fossil fuel.

All unextracted minerals are government property, under the Mining Act. The Department of Mines and Geology, under the Ministry of Environment and Natural Resources, controls exploration and exploitation of minerals.

Industry and manufacturing

Although Kenya is the most industrially developed country in East Africa, manufacturing still accounts for only 14% of GDP. This represents only a slight increase since independence. The rapid expansion of the sector immediately after independence stagnated in the 1980s, hampered by shortages in hydroelectric power, high energy costs, dilapidated transport infrastructure, and the dumping of cheap imports. However, due to urbanisation, the industry and manufacturing sectors have become increasingly important to the Kenyan economy, and this has been reflected by an increasing GDP per capita. Industrial activity, concentrated around the three largest urban centres, Nairobi, Mombasa, and Kisumu, is dominated by food-processing industries such as grain milling, beer production, and sugarcane crushing, and the fabrication of consumer goods, e.g., vehicles from kits. Kenya also has an oil refinery that processes imported crude petroleum into petroleum products, mainly for the domestic market. In addition, a substantial and expanding informal sector engages in small-scale manufacturing of household goods, motor-vehicle parts, and farm implements.

Kenya's inclusion among the beneficiaries of the US Government's African Growth and Opportunity Act (AGOA) gave a boost to manufacturing. Since AGOA took effect in 2000, Kenya's clothing sales to the United States increased from US$44 million to US$270M in 2006. Other initiatives to strengthen manufacturing include favourable tax measures, including the removal of duty on capital equipment and other raw materials.

Energy

The largest segment of Kenya's electricity supply comes from hydroelectric stations at dams along the upper Tana River, as well as the Turkwel Gorge Dam in the west. A petroleum-fired plant on the coast, geothermal facilities at Olkaria (near Nairobi), and electricity imported from Uganda make up the balance. Kenya's installed capacity stood at 1,142 megawatts a year between 2001 and 2003. The state-owned Kenya Electricity Generating Company (KenGen), established in 1997 under the name Kenya Power Company, handles the generation of electricity, while the Kenya Power and Lighting Company (KPLC) handles transmission and distribution. Shortfalls of electricity occur periodically, when drought reduces water flow. In 1997 and 2000, for example, drought prompted severe power rationing, with economically damaging 12-hour blackouts. Frequent outages and high cost of power remain serious obstacles to economic activity. Tax and other concessions are planned to encourage investment in hydroelectricity and in geothermal energy, in which Kenya is a pioneer. The government plans to open two new power stations in 2008, Sondu Miriu (hydroelectric) and Olkaria IV (geothermal), but power demand growth is strong, and demand is still expected to outpace supply during periods of drought.

Kenya currently imports all crude petroleum requirements, and petroleum accounts for 20% to 25% of the national import bill. Hydrocarbon reserves were recently found in Kenya's semi-arid northern region of Turkana after several decades of intermittent exploration. Offshore prospecting also continues. Kenya Petroleum Refineries, a 50:50 joint venture between the government and several major oil corporations, operates the country's sole oil refinery in Mombasa. The refinery's production is transported via Kenya's Mombasa–Nairobi pipeline. However, the refinery is currently non-operational. In 2004, oil consumption was estimated at  a day.

Tourism

Kenya's services sector, which contributes about 63% of GDP, is dominated by tourism. The tourism sector exhibited steady growth after independence and by the late 1980s had become the country's principal source of foreign exchange. In the late 1990s, a terrorism-related downturn in tourism followed the 1998 bombing of the U.S Embassy in Nairobi and subsequent negative travel advisories from Western governments. The government of Kenya and tourism industry organisations have taken steps to address security issues and to reverse negative publicity, including establishing a tourist police and launching marketing campaigns in key tourist origin markets.

Tourists are attracted to the coastal beaches and the game reserves, notably the expansive Tsavo East National Park and Tsavo West National Park (20,808 square kilometres) in the southeast. The majority of tourists are from Germany and the United Kingdom.  In 2006 tourism generated US$803 million, up from US$699 million the previous year.

Kenya has also contributed to boosting tourism in other countries; the Nairobi-headquartered Serena Hotel is the most consistently high-rated hotel in Pakistan.

Financial services
Kenya is East Africa's hub for financial services. The Nairobi Stock Exchange (NSE) is ranked 4th in Africa in terms of market capitalisation. One of the popular ways to invest in Kenya is through Money Market Funds (MMFs). This is because money market funds offer a high return than a typical bank savings account without compromising on the ability to withdraw at any time.

The Kenya banking system is supervised by the Central Bank of Kenya. As of late July 2004, the system consisted of 43 commercial banks (down from 48 in 2001), several non-bank financial institutions, including mortgage companies, four savings and loan associations, and many foreign-exchange bureaus. Two of the four largest banks, the Kenya Commercial Bank and the National Bank of Kenya, are partially government-owned, and the others, Barclays Bank and Standard Chartered, are majority foreign-owned. Most of the smaller banks are family-owned and -operated.

Kenya has a number of high-profile accounting, tax and audit firms having a presence in the region providing financial services. The Big Four accounting firms, Mazars, Grant Thornton International, PKF International actively operate within the financial system, and are often responsible for the audit of Nairobi Stock Exchange (NSE) firms. A number of large local firms such as Anant Bhatt LLP, BC Patel & Co, Githuku Mwangi & Kabia, Devani & Devani, and KKCO also play an integral part in serving the needs of Sacco Societies Regulatory Authority registered companies and private companies within the financial ecosystem.

Labour
In 2006, Kenya's labour force was estimated to include about 12 million workers, almost 75% in agriculture. The number employed outside small-scale agriculture and pastoralism was about 6 million. In 2004, about 15% of the labour force was officially classified as unemployed. Other estimates place Kenya's unemployment much higher, in some estimates up to 40%. In recent years, Kenya's labour force has shifted from the countryside to the cities, such as Nairobi, as Kenya becomes increasingly urbanised.

The labour force participation rate in Kenya has been constant from 1997 to 2010 for both women and men. In 1997, 65% of women were employed in some type of labour and 76% of men were employed. In 2005, 60% of women and 70% of men were in the labour force, increasing slightly to 61% of women and 72% of men in 2010.

Family farm labour
In the past 20 years, Kenyans have moved away from family farming towards jobs that pay wages or to start small businesses outside of agriculture. In 1989, 4.5 million Kenyans out of a total working population of 7.3M worked on family farms. In 2009, only 6.5M Kenyans out of a total working population of 14.3M worked on family farms. Of these, 3.8M were women and 2.7M were men.

Wage-job labour
According to the World Bank 2012 Kenya Economic Update, "Men are much more likely than women to hold wage jobs, and women are more likely to work on family farms. Twice as many men as women hold wage jobs, and more men work principally in wage jobs than on family farms. Most Kenyans are now striving to get modern, wage jobs." Modern wage jobs include being an "engineer, telecommunication specialist, cut flower worker, teacher, construction worker, housekeepers, professionals, any industrial and manufacturing job, and port and dock workers." In 1989, there were only 1.9M Kenyans employed in wage work. In 2009 this number had increased to 5.1M. In 2009, 3.4M men and 1.3M women were employed in wage jobs.

Non-farm self-employment/"Jua Kali"
In Kenya, the "Jua Kali" sector is another name for the informal economy, also described as non-farming self-employment. Jua Kali is Swahili for "hot sun" and refers to the idea that the workers in the informal economy work under the fierce sun. The informal sector consists of self-employment and wage employment that are neither regulated by the Kenyan government nor recognized for legal protection. As a result, informal sector employment does not contribute to Kenya's GDP. Non-farm self-employment has risen from 1989 to 2009.

The World Bank characterizes non-farm self-employment to include jobs such as "street vendor, shop owner, dressmaker, assistant, fishmonger, caterer, etc." Non-farm self-employment has risen from a total of 0.9M in 1989 to a total of 2.7M in 2009. Men make up 1.4M workers, and women workers number 1.3M.

As of 2009, Kenya's informal economy accounts for about 80% of the total employment for the country. Most informal workers are self-employed, with few entrepreneurs who employ others. The informal sector contributes economic activity equal to 35% of the total GDP in Kenya, provides an informal finance structure in the shape of the rotating savings and credit associations (ROSCAs), and provides an income for those with lower socioeconomic status.

The drawbacks of the informal economy are that it promotes smuggling and tax evasion, and lacks social protection. Most members of the informal sector have low educational attainment but are responsible for developing all of their own skilled labour through apprenticeships. Many choose to enter the informal economy due to the lack of fees, shorter training sessions, and the availability of practical content that is largely absent from formal education. The rising cost of education and lack of guarantees of future employment have caused many workers to transfer to informal apprenticeships.

The impact of customary law on the informal economy 
Customary law has some adverse impacts on women in the informal sector. The 1882 Married Women's Property Act gives married women equal property rights and the Law of Succession Act gives women inheritance rights, but the constitution exempts those who are considered "members of a particular race or tribe" from being governed by these laws, and instead allows customary law to remain in practice. Customary law allows for discrimination against women and keeps them from accessing assets, land, and property that might otherwise allow them to have collateral for business finance. This restricts the amount of credit that women entrepreneurs might otherwise use to enter either the formal or informal sector. Some examples of discriminatory statutes in the constitution are the Law of Succession Act, the Divorce Laws, and the Children's Act 2001. The overall result is that unmarried women inherit less than their brothers, married women are not expected to receive any inheritance, and a woman only has permission to manage her husband's property as a surrogate for her sons. Women without children are still omitted from inheritance on the death of their husband. Because women have fewer assets and low educational attainment, women are more likely to turn to the informal economy than men.

Challenges
The economy's heavy dependence on rain-fed agriculture and the tourism sector leaves it vulnerable to cycles of boom and bust. The agricultural sector employs nearly 75% of the country's 38 million people. Half of the sector's output remains subsistence production.

Kenya's economic performance has been hampered by numerous factors: heavy dependence on a few agricultural exports that are vulnerable to world price fluctuations, population growth that has outstripped economic growth, prolonged drought that has necessitated power rationing, deteriorating infrastructure, and extreme disparities of wealth that have limited the opportunities of most to develop their skills and knowledge. Poor governance and corruption also have had a negative impact on growth, making it expensive to do business in Kenya. Increased levels of insecurity brought on from terrorism has become one of the largest impediments to sustainable growth. According to Transparency International, Kenya ranks among the world's six most corrupt countries. Bribery and fraud cost Kenya as much as US$1 billion a year. Kenyans pay some 16 bribes a month, for two in every three encounters with public officials, even though 23% of them live on less than US$1 per day.

Despite these challenges, two thirds of Kenyans expect living conditions to improve in the coming decades.

See also
 :Category: Companies of Kenya
List of counties of Kenya by GDP
 Eco-Pesa
 Vision 2030
 Central Bank of Kenya
 United Nations Economic Commission for Africa
Kenya Trade Data

References

Notes

Further reading

External links

 CBIK – the Center for Business Information in Kenya, a division of the Kenya Export Promotion Council
 KenInvest; the Kenya Investment Authority, formed by the government of Kenya in 2004
 
 Kenya latest trade data on ITC Trade Map
 Bio Jane Kiringai
 About Johannes Zutt
 News
 Business Daily
 Sisal export in Kenya
 Daily Nation Business
 The Standard Business
Trade
Kenya Export, Import, Trade Balance

 
Economics in developing countries
World Trade Organization member economies
African Union member economies